Heering Cherry Liqueur is a Danish liqueur flavored with cherries. It is often referred to simply as Peter Heering or Cherry Heering in cocktail recipes. Heering Cherry Liqueur has been produced since 1818, and the company is purveyor to the Royal Danish Court and formerly to Queen Elizabeth II. It is sold in more than 100 countries. 

Heering Cherry Liqueur is an ingredient of cocktails including the Singapore Sling and Blood & Sand. Cherry Heering is used in baking; some of the alcohol evaporates as part of the process.

Historically produced by the Peter F. Heering company in Denmark, the liqueur brand was acquired by Dutch spirits group DeKuyper for an undisclosed sum in October 2017.

References

External links

 Source

Cherry liqueurs and spirits
Purveyors to the Court of Denmark
Danish company founders
People from Roskilde
Businesspeople from Copenhagen
Danish companies established in 1818
Danish brands
Food and drink companies established in 1818
Heering